The Torchlight Parade is the finale in a long series of parades around the greater Seattle area under the auspices of Seafair, a Seattle summertime celebration. The parade is one of the original Seafair events dating to the 1950 centennial celebration.  The first parade was held on August 12, 1950, in the afternoon, as the Seafair Grande Parade.

The Torchlight Parade is usually held on either the last Saturday in July or the first Saturday in August.  The parade starts in the evening, close to dusk, which gives it the name. Because of the dark, participants are encouraged to include creative uses of light and luminescent devices in their display.  The parade draws an estimated crowd of over 300,000 people each year. Some of those wanting a prime viewing location arrive the night before with couches, rugs, and portable refrigerators.

The parade has had several route changes in its history.  The first year it was held in a loop on 2nd and 3rd Avenues.  It was later changed to start at 4th and Madison and make its way to Memorial Stadium. The current parade route begins by Seattle Center, follows 4th Avenue through Downtown Seattle and ends at the north parking lot of Lumen Field, a distance of about 2 to 2.5 miles.

Participants include, among other things:
Seafair Pirates
Seattle All-City Marching Band (one of the longest continuing entrants)
University of Washington Husky Marching Band
Multicultural floats, including floats and participants from around the world
Award-winning drill teams and dance squads such as the Seattle Chinese Community Girls Drill Team
Dragon dances
Seafair Clowns
Blue Angels float
Companies including Seattle City Light, Group Health and Holland America.
Hydroplanes and their respective drivers and their families

There are also torchlight parades held in Dorset towns in the United Kingdom in August.

See also
 Ndocciata, a torchlight parade traditionally held on Christmas Eve in Molise, Italy
 https://www.seafair.com/p/about

References

Seafair
Parades in the United States